Sassy Swings the Tivoli is a 1963 live album by American jazz singer Sarah Vaughan and her trio, produced by Quincy Jones. The performances were recorded in the concert hall of the Tivoli Gardens, Copenhagen, over four days in July 1963.

Reception
The initial Billboard review from October 12, 1963 commented Vaughan was "really swinging on this album", and described it as a "must for Sassy's fans" and that there was "radiation on both sides of the footlights".

Scott Yanow on Allmusic.com gave the album four and a half stars out of five and commented that the album was a "gem" that this "wonderful live session" was "one of her very best of the 1960s".

Track listing
Disc one
 "I Feel Pretty" (Leonard Bernstein, Stephen Sondheim)  - 2:34
 "Misty" (Johnny Burke, Erroll Garner)  - 5:56
 "What Is This Thing Called Love?" (Cole Porter)  - 2:04
 "Lover Man (Oh, Where Can You Be?)" (Jimmy Davis, Ram Ramirez, Jimmy Sherman)  - 5:56
 "Sometimes I'm Happy" (Irving Caesar, Clifford Grey, Vincent Youmans)  - 4:30
 "Won't You Come Home, Bill Bailey?" (Hughie Cannon) - 3:14
 "Tenderly" (Walter Gross, Jack Lawrence)  - 2:33
 "Sassy's Blues" (Quincy Jones, Sarah Vaughan)  - 5:40
 "Polka Dots and Moonbeams" (Johnny Burke, Jimmy Van Heusen)  - 4:27
 "I Cried for You" (Gus Arnheim, Arthur Freed, Abe Lyman)  - 2:20
 "Poor Butterfly" (John Golden, Raymond Hubbell)  - 3:12
 "I Could Write a Book" (Lorenz Hart, Richard Rodgers)  - 2:21
 "Time After Time" (Sammy Cahn, Jule Styne)  - 4:56
 "All of Me" (Gerald Marks, Seymour Simons)  - 1:43
 "I Hadn't Anyone Till You" (Ray Noble)  - 3:17
 "I Can't Give You Anything But Love" (Dorothy Fields, Jimmy McHugh)  - 2:46

Disc two
 "I'll Be Seeing You" (Sammy Fain, Irving Kahal)  - 5:32
 "Maria" (Bernstein, Sondheim)  - 5:51
 "Day In, Day Out" (Rube Bloom, Johnny Mercer)  - 2:15
 "Fly Me to the Moon" (Bart Howard)  - 4:39
 "Baubles, Bangles and Beads" (George Forrest, Robert C. Wright)  - 3:07
 "The Lady's in Love With You" (Burton Lane, Frank Loesser)  - 2:15
 "Honeysuckle Rose" (Andy Razaf, Fats Waller)  - 3:14
 "What Is This Thing Called Love?"  - 2:01
 "Lover Man (Oh, Where Can You Be?)"  - 4:06
 "I Cried for You"  - 2:19
 "The More I See You" (Mack Gordon, Harry Warren)  - 5:26
 "Say It Isn't So" (Irving Berlin)  - 5:11
 "Black Coffee" (Sonny Burke, Paul Francis Webster)  - 4:40
 "Just One of Those Things" (Porter)  - 2:33
 "On Green Dolphin Street" (Bronisław Kaper, Ned Washington)  - 3:04*
 "Over the Rainbow" (Harold Arlen, Yip Harburg)  - 5:10

Personnel 
 Sarah Vaughan - vocals
 Kirk Stuart - piano, vocals on "Misty"
 Charles Williams - double bass
 George Hughes - drums
 Quincy Jones - producer

References

Sarah Vaughan live albums
1963 live albums
Mercury Records live albums
Albums produced by Quincy Jones